The New Brunswick order of precedence is a nominal and symbolic hierarchy of important positions within the province of New Brunswick. It has no legal standing but is used to dictate ceremonial protocol at events of a provincial nature.

 The King of Canada (His Majesty Charles III)
The Lieutenant Governor (Brenda Murphy)
The Premier (Blaine Higgs)
The Chief Justice of New Brunswick 
The Speaker of the Legislative Assembly 
Former Lieutenant Governors 
Former Premiers 
Former Chief Justices of New Brunswick 
Ambassadors, High Commissioners, Ministers Plenipotentiary, and Chargé d'Affaires with precedence to their date of appointment 
Members of the Executive Council of New Brunswick with precedence in accordance with the Executive Council Act 
Leader of the Opposition 
Chief Justice of the Court of King's Bench 
Members of the Senate 
Members of the House of Commons 
Judges of the Court of Appeal with precedence according to their date of appointment 
Judges of the Court of King's Bench with precedence according to their date of appointment 
Members of the Legislative Assembly in the following order: Deputy Speaker, Government House Leader, Opposition House Leader, Leaders of Unofficial Opposition Parties, other members with precedence according to their date and order of their swearing in as Members of the Legislature 
Elders and Chiefs of New Brunswick Indian Bands 
Leaders of religious denominations with precedence according to their date of appointment or election to the present office 
Chief Judge of the Provincial Court 
Judges of the Provincial Court with precedence according to their date of appointment 
Members of the Consular Corps in the following order: Consuls General, Consuls, Vice- Consuls, Honorary Consuls and Consular Agents with precedence among themselves according to their date of appointment 
Mayors of the Cities of New Brunswick (with precedence given to the Mayor of the host municipality where appropriate) in the following order: Fredericton, Saint John, Moncton, Edmundston, Campbellton, Bathurst, Miramichi and Dieppe 
Mayors of the Towns of New Brunswick with precedence among themselves according to the alphabetical order of the place-names 
Mayors of the Villages of New Brunswick with precedence according to the alphabetical order of the place-names 
Councillors of the Cities, Towns, and Villages of New Brunswick in the same order of precedence among themselves according to the alphabetical order of their surnames 
Clerk of the Legislative Assembly 
Ombudsman 
Auditor General 
Commissioner of Official Languages for New Brunswick 
Clerk of the Executive Council 
Deputy Heads of the Civil Service, with precedence according to their date of appointment 
Heads of Crown Corporations and Agencies, with precedence according to their date of appointment 
Assistant Commissioner of "J" Division, Royal Canadian Mounted Police 
Commander of Canadian Forces Base Gagetown 
Chancellors of New Brunswick Universities in the following order: University of New Brunswick, Mount Allison University, St. Thomas University and Université de Moncton 
Presidents of the Universities of New Brunswick in the same order of precedence as the Chancellors

External links
Table of Precedence for New Brunswick

New Brunswick